Hadith Isa bin Hisham, or "A Period in Time" is a work of literature by Muḥammad al-Muwayliḥī first published in serial form between April 1898 and August 1903 in the Egyptian newspaper . The serialized pieces were compiled and published in a book in 1907.

The episodes published serially often presented satirical political commentary in the vein of Yaqub Sanu's Abu Naddara or Abdullah an-Nadeem's at-Tankit wat-Tabkit.

The work is characterized by a combination of old and new styles. It takes the form of a maqama, a classic form of Arabic literature dating back to the 10th century, and its protagonist and titular character is Isa bin Hisham—protagonist of Badi' az-Zaman al-Hamadhani's classic Baghdadi Maqama. In the story, Isa bin Hisham wanders through a cemetery for reflection and encounters an Ottoman pasha revived from the dead. Through their journey together, Muwayliḥī raisies critiques of Egyptian society and comments on the changes and reforms that impacted it in the last period of the Ottoman Empire, in the judicial system, policing, education, theater, and in other areas. One of the issues Muwayliḥī addresses is the question of authenticity and modernity.

It was the only book other than the Quran that Naguib Mahfouz's father had read.

References 

Arabic literature
Egyptian literature
Satirical books
Nahda
Egyptian political satire